Mihalcea is a Romanian surname. Notable people with the surname include:

Adrian Mihalcea (born 1976), Romanian football player and manager
Camelia Macoviciuc-Mihalcea (born 1968), Romanian rower

See also
The Romanian name for Mykhalcha Commune, Storozhynets Raion, Ukraine

Romanian-language surnames